RNSP can refer to:
Redwood National and State Parks, in the United States, created in 1968
Russian National Socialist Party, neo-Nazi party formed in 1998